David Hotyat was charged for the killings of a real estate promoter named Xavier Flactif and his girlfriend and children. Their bodies were then taken to the forest and burned on a pyre. The massacre took place in Le Grand-Bornand, Haute-Savoie, France.

References

2003 in France
Mass murder in 2003
French mass murderers
French people convicted of murder
French murderers of children
1972 births
Living people
Family murders